Mirza Kurtović (born 2 August 1977) is a former Macedonian professional basketball point guard who played for MZT Skopje Aerodrom, Rabotnički, Kumanovo in Macedonia. In the 2005–06 season he played for Iraklis in Greece. He was also member of Macedonia national basketball team.

External links

References

1977 births
Living people
Ionikos N.F. B.C. players
Iraklis Thessaloniki B.C. players
Macedonian men's basketball players
Olympia Larissa B.C. players
Peristeri B.C. players
Point guards
Sportspeople from Skopje
KK MZT Skopje players
KK Rabotnički players